Skinlingyong is a village in the Leh district of Ladakh, India. It is located in the Khalsi tehsil.

Demographics 
According to the 2011 census of India, Skinlingyong has 38 households. The effective literacy rate (i.e. the literacy rate of population excluding children aged 6 and below) is 66.51%.

References 

Villages in Khalsi tehsil